Lubieszewo  is a village in the administrative district of Gmina Złocieniec, within Drawsko County, West Pomeranian Voivodeship, in north-western Poland.

References

villages in Drawsko County